A Cornhusker is a person or machine that removes the husk from a corncob. It may refer to:

 Cornhusker state, the nickname of the U.S. state of Nebraska
 Nebraska Cornhuskers, the name given to the athletic teams of the University of Nebraska

See also